Pierre-Paul may refer to:

Places 
 Lac Pierre-Paul (Mékinac), part of the Batiscanie watershed, in Quebec, Canada
 Pierre-Paul River, part of the Batiscanie watershed, in Quebec, Canada

People 
 Pierre-Paul (name)

See also 
 
 
 Peter Paul (disambiguation)